Mehar is an Indian and Pakistani Punjabi suremane name that is used by Arain faimily and may refer to
Given name
Mehar Chand Bhaskar, Indian weightlifter
Mehar Chand Dhawan, 20th century Indian sprinter and triple jumper
Mehar Mittal (1935–2016), Indian Punjabi actor and producer
Mehar Singh, Fijian trade unionist
Mehar Singh (pilot) (1915–1952), Indian fighter pilot
Jat Mehar Singh (1918–1945), Indian poet

Surname

Indian masculine given names